The 2017 Nordic Junior Artistic Gymnastics Championships was an artistic gymnastics competition held in Oslo, Norway. The event was held between 19 and 21 May.

Medalists

References 

Nordic
Nordic